Elwood Park may refer to 
Ellwood Park, Baltimore
Elwood Park, Florida
Elwood Park in Elwood, New York

See also 
Elmwood Park, Illinois
Elmwood Park, Wisconsin